Eldir (Old Norse: , "fire-stoker") is a servant of Ægir in Norse mythology, and Loki's first verbal opponent in the poem Lokasenna (Loki's Flyting).

According to John Lindow, "Eldir fits the character type of the outer guardian, often a herdsman as in Skírnismál (11–16) with whom someone contends before entering a place for the main confrontation".

Name 
The Old Norse name Eldir has been translated as 'fire-stoker'.

Attestations 
The beginning of Lokasenna (Loki's Flyting) tells that people greatly praised Ægir's two servants, and that Loki killed one of them, Fimafeng, out of jealousy. The murderer is then chased by the gods from Ægir's hall, and upon his return, Loki confronts Eldir and asks him what the Æsir are discussing in the hall. Eldir replies that they are judging their weapons and prowess, and adds that no one is a friend of Loki’s in words. Loki then announces that he about to enter the hall and blend mead with harmful power.

Notes

References

Servants in Norse mythology